This is a partial list of commercial or professional recordings of Johann Sebastian Bach's cantata Christ lag in Todes Banden, BWV 4, organized chronologically. 

The Bach cantatas fell into obscurity after the composer's death and, in the context of their revival, Christ lag in Todes Banden stands out as being having been recorded early and often; as of 2016, the Bach Cantatas Website lists 77 different complete recordings, the earliest dating from 1931.

First recordings
In 1931 Lluís Millet conducted the Orfeó Català in 's Catalan version of the cantata. The performance was recorded by La Voz de su Amo (His Master's Voice) and appeared on three 78 rpm discs.

In 1937 Nadia Boulanger made her first recording of the cantata in Paris for Voix de son maître (His Master's Voice), but this appears not to have been released commercially at the time. She also recorded the work in the USA in 1938.

Later recordings
The entries in the following table are taken from the listings on the Bach Cantatas Website. Some recordings rely on choir without (or with few) solo voices. Choirs with one voice per part (OVPP) and orchestras playing on period instruments in historically informed performances are  marked by green background.

References 

Discographies of compositions by J. S. Bach